Odontolytes denominatus is a species of aphodiine dung beetle in the family Scarabaeidae. It is found in the Caribbean Sea, Central America, North America, and South America.

References

Further reading

 

Scarabaeidae
Articles created by Qbugbot
Beetles described in 1864